Fouzi Mesaoudi (born 27 May 1981 in the Netherlands) is a Dutch retired footballer.

Career

After playing for Sparta Rotterdam in the Dutch second division, Mesaoudi signed for Chelsea, one of the most successful teams in England, but never made an appearance for them.

In 2005/06, he signed for Scottish club Falkirk after missing a transfer to Tottenham Hotspur in England, but again failed to make an appearance.

Due to injury, Mesaoudi eventually returned to the Netherlands, where he played amateur football.

References

External links
 

Dutch footballers
Living people
Association football midfielders
1981 births
People from Alphen aan den Rijn
Sparta Rotterdam players
HFC Haarlem players